Joy is the tenth studio album by R&B singer Teddy Pendergrass, released in 1988 on the Elektra label. Production credits on the album were split between Reggie and Vincent Calloway, Nick Martinelli, Miles Jaye and Pendergrass himself.

Joy peaked at #54 on the Billboard 200 and #2 on the R&B chart, Pendergrass' highest placing on this chart since 1979's #1 album Teddy. The album also spawned two top three R&B singles in the chart-topping title track (Pendergrass' second solo R&B #1, following "Close the Door" in 1978) and "2 A.M." (#3). It was also the only solo Pendergrass album to reach the top 50 in the UK.

Track listing
"Joy" (Reggie Calloway, Vincent Calloway, Joel Davis) - 6:18
"2 A.M" (James S. Carter, Kevin J. Askins, Marvin Hammett) - 5:25
"Good to You" (Miles Jaye) - 5:13
"I'm Ready" (Jaye) - 5:12
"Love Is the Power" (R. Calloway, V. Calloway, Davis) - 6:16
"This Is the Last Time" (Gabriel Hardeman, Annette Hardeman) - 6:27
"Through the Falling Rain (Love Story)" (Carter, Askins, Hammett) - 4:58
"Can We Be Lovers" (Carter, Freddie Williams) - 5:29

Personnel
Teddy Pendergrass - lead vocals
Charlene Hollaway, Cynthia Biggs, Annette Hardeman, Elizabeth Hogue, Tenita Jordan - backing vocals
Gene Robinson, Jeff Lee Johnson, Randy Bowland, William "Doc" Powell - guitar
Miles Jaye - bass guitar, percussion, synthesizers, violin
Joel Davis - keyboards
Jerry Hey, Gary Grant - trumpet
Bill Reichenbach Jr. - trombone
Marc Russo - saxophone
Daryl Burgee, J.T. Lewis - drums
Randy Cantor - synthesizers, strings
Douglas Grigsby III, Tom Barney - bass guitar
Donald Robinson - Rhodes, piano
John "Skip" Anderson - electric piano

1988 albums
Teddy Pendergrass albums
Elektra Records albums